"Stuff That Matters" is a song recorded by Canadian country music artist Tara Lyn Hart. It was released in October 1999 as the first single from her debut album, Tara Lyn Hart. It peaked at number 6 on the RPM Country Tracks chart in November 1999.

Chart performance

Year-end charts

References

1999 songs
Tara Lyn Hart songs
Columbia Records singles
Song recordings produced by Josh Leo
1999 debut singles